The 1930 Princeton Tigers football team was an American football team that represented Princeton University as an independent during the 1930 college football season. In their 17th and final year under head coach Bill Roper, the Tigers finished with a 1–5–1 record and were outscored by a total of 164 to 55. 

Guard Ricardo A. Mestres was elected as the team captain. No Princeton players were selected as first-team honorees on the 1930 College Football All-America Team.

Schedule

References

Princeton
Princeton Tigers football seasons
Princeton Tigers football